Hendrik Jan Davids and Paul Haarhuis were the defending champions, but Haarhuis did not participate this year.  Davids partnered Ģirts Dzelde, losing in the first round.

Eric Jelen and Carl-Uwe Steeb won the title, defeating Andrei Cherkasov and Alexander Volkov 6–4, 7–6 in the final.

Seeds

Draw

Draw

External links
Draw

Kremlin Cup
Kremlin Cup